RostiPollos is a Central American cuisine restaurant franchise founded in Costa Rica by Nicaraguan businessman Mauricio Mendieta.

About
The first restaurant was opened in the wealthy Escazú district of San José, Costa Rica in 1983 by the husband-and-wife team of Mauricio Mendieta Herdocia and Ivania Espinosa. As Mauricio Mendieta is Nicaraguan, the restaurant claims to be the first Nicaraguan restaurant to have franchises.

Location
It now has locations in Costa Rica and Nicaragua.

See also
 List of chicken restaurants

References

External links
Official website (in Spanish)
RostiPollos Costa Rican site

Restaurant chains
Costa Rican cuisine
Food and drink companies of Costa Rica
Restaurants established in 1983
Poultry restaurants